Snowshill is a small Cotswolds village and civil parish in Gloucestershire, England, located near Broadway, Worcestershire. The population taken at the 2011 census was 164.

Prehistoric history
An important early Bronze Age hoard was found outside Snowshill in the late nineteenth century. Excavated from a barrow in 1881, it includes a picrite battle-axe and bronze pin, dagger and spear-head. Dated to between 2100 and 1600 BC, it is now in the British Museum's collection.

Snowshill Manor

Snowshill is best known for nearby Snowshill Manor, a National Trust property open to the public. The manor house contains an unusual collection of furniture, musical instruments, craft tools, toys, clocks, bicycles and armour, all collected by architect and craftsman Charles Paget Wade between 1900 and 1951. His Arts and Crafts-style gardens are arranged in an eccentric combination of terraces and ponds forming outdoor rooms, with bright colours and delightful scents.

Snowshill Lavender
Snowshill is also the home to Snowshill Lavender, a farm with 35 acres (142,000 m²) of lavender fields, which also sells lavender products, plants and local crafts.

Gallery

References

External links

 Snowshill Manor information at the National Trust
 Snowshill Lavender
 Snowshill Tourist Information

Villages in Gloucestershire
Borough of Tewkesbury